Edward James Lawrence (July 16, 1906 – November 21, 1961) was a professional football player who spent two seasons in the National Football League with the Boston Bulldogs in 1929 and the Staten Island Stapletons in 1930. Prior to joining the NFL, Lawrence played college football at Brown University. He was a member of the 1926 "Iron Men" football team, which went 9-0-1 and played all but two minutes against Yale, Dartmouth, and Harvard.

Notes

1906 births
1961 deaths
Players of American football from Massachusetts
Boston Bulldogs (NFL) players
Staten Island Stapletons players
Brown Bears football players
Sportspeople from Fitchburg, Massachusetts